Abdoulaye Sekou Sampil (born 9 December 1984) is a French professional footballer who plays for KFC Dessel Sport.

Career
He formerly played in Belgium for Cappellen and in the Netherlands for FC Eindhoven.

References

1984 births
Living people
French footballers
French sportspeople of Senegalese descent
Senegalese footballers
Footballers from Dakar
Expatriate footballers in the Netherlands
FC Sochaux-Montbéliard players
Expatriate footballers in Belgium
FC Eindhoven players
Expatriate footballers in Italy
LB Châteauroux players
French expatriate sportspeople in Belgium
K.F.C. Dessel Sport players
French expatriate sportspeople in the Netherlands
K.S.K. Beveren players
French expatriate sportspeople in Italy
A.C. Carpi players
Ivorian expatriates in Italy
Royal Cappellen F.C. players
Association football forwards